Morio (written: , , , , , , ,  or ) is a masculine Japanese given name. Notable people with the name include:

, Japanese singer-songwriter and actor
, Japanese anime director
, Japanese karateka
, Japanese actor
, pen-name of Sokichi Saitō, Japanese writer and psychiatrist
, Imperial Japanese Navy admiral
, Japanese artist
, Japanese long-distance runner
, Japanese politician
, Japanese economist and diplomat

Morio is also a Japanese surname. Notable people with the surname include:

, Japanese gymnast

Japanese-language surnames
Japanese masculine given names